The Twin Pagoda Temple, officially known as Yongzuo Temple, of Taiyuan, Shanxi Province, China, is a temple containing two pagodas dating from the Ming dynasty.

History

The East pagoda was built in 1597, and the West one in 1612. In charge of the pagoda’s construction was a high ranking monk, named Fodeng (佛灯). By the 20th century, deterioration since construction had caused the East pagoda to slant from its center of gravity by 2.87 meters. In 1995, experts set about trying to correct the slant. They removed earth from underneath the pagoda and successfully corrected the pagoda's tilt.

Pagodas

The pagodas are the tallest set of twin pagodas in China. They are both eight-cornered, with the lowest floor being comparatively taller than the rest, the size of the upper floors progressively decreasing. The West Pagoda is 54.78 meters tall, with the lowest floor’s circumference being 4.16 meters. The pagoda’s eaves are painted with emerald green glaze.  The East Pagoda is 53.3 meters high, and the lowest floor’s circumference is 4.36 meters. On top of the East pagoda are three magic gourds (宝葫芦), with the upper two parts being made of copper.

Temple

The temple contains approximately 260 stone steles, as it is the location where stele from temples in the area that are no longer extant were moved. The temple grounds also contain many peony trees, one of which dates from the Ming Dynasty.

Notes

References
Xu Xiaoying, ed. Zhongguo Guta Zaoxing. Beijing: Chinese Forest Press, 2007.
Zhao Yu, ed. Shanxi. Beijing: Chinese Travel Press, 2007

Pagodas in China
Buddhist temples in Taiyuan
Ming dynasty architecture
Major National Historical and Cultural Sites in Shanxi
Buildings and structures in Taiyuan